The Béjart Ballet Lausanne is a Swiss ballet company. It is based in the city of Lausanne and performs all over the world.

The Béjart Ballet Lausanne was founded in 1987. It was established by Maurice Béjart, a well-known choreographer who had previously founded and managed the Ballet of the 20th Century in Brussels, Belgium. Since the disappearance of the founder in 2007, Gil Roman, dancer and choreographer was the artistic director till November 2021.

Maurice Béjart always wanted to open the world of the ballet to a larger audience. Animated by the same spirit, Gil Roman and his dancers perform all over the world. Béjart Ballet Lausanne is one of the very few companies able to fill vast spaces such as the NHK Hall of Tokyo, the Kremlin State Palace of Moscow, Odeon of Herodes Atticus in Athens, the Palais des congrès de Paris, Forest National in Brussels or the Patinoire of Malley-Lausanne.

Since 2007 till 2021, with his search and work for contemporary creation Gil Roman to maintains and develops the repertoire of the Béjart Ballet Lausanne. The work of Maurice Béjart is at the heart of this repertoire, with emblematic choreographies, as The Rite of Spring, Boléro, The Ninth Symphony or Ballet for Life but Gil Roman also wants to present the variety of this repertoire, with Piaf or The Magic Flute for example. Choreographer for 20 years, the artistic director also nourished the repertoire with his own creations. Choreographers like Alonzo King, Tony Fabre, Christophe Garcia, Giorgio Madia, Yuka Oishi or Julio Arozarena also contributed to the creative development of the Béjart Ballet Lausanne.

The Company remains faithful to its vocation: preserving Maurice Béjart’s work, while remaining a space of creation.

See also 
 Prix de Lausanne

References

External links 
 

Lausanne
Ballet companies in Switzerland
Performing groups established in 1987
1987 establishments in Switzerland